Terrance Martin (born July 6, 1979) is a former professional American football nose tackle. He played in 14 games over two seasons in the National Football League (NFL) with the Houston Texans and Cincinnati Bengals. He also played in the Arena Football League in 2007.

Early life and college
Martin played high school football at Lafayette High School in Williamsburg, Virginia. Towards the end of his time there, he was recruited and signed by West Virginia University (WVU). However, academic problems made him ineligible to enroll and play football at WVU. He instead opted to go to Hinds Community College for two years after which he transferred to North Carolina State.

Professional career

NFL

2003 season

After Martin went undrafted in the 2003 NFL Draft, he signed with the Houston Texans in May 2003. In the regular season that year, he played 12 games (starting in one of them). He registered six total tackles, and he also had a kick return for no yardage.

2004 season

On September 4, 2004, the Texans released Martin.

Later that year, he was signed by the Cincinnati Bengals. He appeared in two regular season games, registering one tackle.

The Bengals waived Martin on June 20, 2005.

Arena Football League

Martin played arena football with the Las Vegas Gladiators during their 2007 season.

References

1979 births
Living people
American football defensive tackles
Cincinnati Bengals players
Houston Texans players
NC State Wolfpack football players